The presidency of John Mahama began on 24 July 2012 and ended on 7 January 2017. John became the 11th President of Ghana after he succeeded John Atta Mills who died in office on 24 July 2012. Prior to that, he served as Vice-President of Ghana from January 2009 to July 2012 .

Mahama is the first vice president of Ghana to take over the presidency from the death of his predecessor and is the first head of state of Ghana to have been born after Ghana's independence. He was elected after the December 2012 election to serve as full-time President. He contested re-election for a second term in the 2016 election, but lost to the New Patriotic Party candidate Nana Akufo-Addo. This made him the first president in the history of Ghana to not have won a second term.

Upon assuming office, Mahama continued the Better Ghana Agenda policy vision initiated by his predecessor, John Atta Mills.

2012 general election 

  

Incumbent president John Mahama was declared winner of the presidential election with just 50.7% of the vote, a few thousand votes over the threshold for avoiding a run-off election. Nana Akufo-Addo on the other hand received 47.74%. However, the opposition did not accept the results and accused the Electoral Commission (EC) of tampering with the results. The opposition filed a petition at the Ghanaian Supreme Court to review the election results but Mahama was declared as president, winning a full term.

Reaction 

The non-partisan Coalition of Domestic Election Observers (CODEO), the Economic Community of West African States (ECOWAS) and the African Union (AU) all declared that the elections were, for the most part, free and fair. Despite this, there were still widespread allegations of voting irregularities, though these were dismissed as unsubstantiated by the electoral commission chairman.  As a result of these claims, the New Patriotic Party immediately rejected the results upon their release and its candidate, Nana Akufo-Addo, remarked that his party's leaders would be meeting on 11 December to consider their options, one of which is to contest the results by lodging an appeal in court. Violent opposition was however ruled out.

African Union commission chairman Thomas Yayi flew to Ghana to meet with the two men. He was also reported to have congratulated Mahama on his victory, and charged him to preside over an all-inclusive government. Yayi praised the conduct and the participants of the election.

In anticipation of petitions regarding the election, Chief Justice Georgina Theodora Wood has established two public complaints secretariats to swiftly process such concerns. In a statement after being declared the victor, Mahama gave a reconciliatory message, saying  "I wish to welcome my fellow candidates to join me now as partners in the project of nation building and of creating a better Ghana".

Inauguration 
Mahama was inaugurated on 7 January 2013. Thirteen African Heads of State, one Prime Minister, two Vice-Presidents and 18 government delegations across the world attended his inaugural ceremony at the Black Star Square in Accra when Mahama was sworn-in to begin his own four-year term.
He said in parliament upon being sworn in:
This is the saddest day in our nation's history. Tears have engulfed our nation and we are deeply saddened and distraught and I'm personally devastated, I've lost a father, I've lost a friend, I've lost a mentor and a senior comrade. Ghana is united in grief at this time for our departed president.

Ministers and administration

Initial ministers before the 2012 general election 
All the ministers had appointed by President Mills as part of his government. They continued to serve until January 2013 when his term would have ended. The exception was Henry Kamel, who died after the 7 December election but before the formal handover on 7 January 2013. The ministers were advised to stay on as caretaker ministers until new ones had been confirmed in their place.

Ministers from 2013 to 2017

Policy

National affairs

Dumsor

Dumsor is the frequent, persistent and irregular system of electrical power outage in Ghana. The frequent Ghanaian blackouts are caused by power supply shortage. Ghanaian generating capacity by 2015 was 400-600 megawatts less than what Ghana needed. Ghanaian electricity distributors regularly shed load with rolling blackouts.
At the beginning of 2015, the dumsor schedule went from 24 hours with light and 12 without to 12 hours with light and 24 without. 
In August 2012, the government told Ghanaians that a ship's anchor cut the West African Gas Pipeline (WAGP), forcing gas turbines to shut down for lack of fuel.
The Mahama government blamed it on the government's inability to add significant generating capacity over the years and promised to fix this. Karpower Burge was brought in to solve the problem. The government stated that it has plans to diversify its energy sources, using more renewables. It was also working to encourage energy conservation.

The Ghanaian Ministry of Power was created in November 2014, using the same staff as the continuing Ghanaian Ministry of Energy in response to dumsor.

Infrastructure 
Mahama began the first phase of the Kejetia Central Market in 2015 and was valued at a cost of US$259,425,000. Upon completion, it was the largest single market in West Africa. In 2015, he cut the sod for the construction of the Ho Airport which is the first airport in the Volta Region. Construction of the Terminal 3 at the Kotoka International Airport began on 1 March 2016. The project was financed by the Ghana Airports Company Limited at the cost of $250 million. Turkish company, MAPA constructions and Trade Company, was the main contractor. The sold cutting was done by President John Mahama and Turkish President Recep Tayyip Erdoğan with the latter on a state visit to Ghana. The new terminal was completed in 2018 by the subsequent administration. On 14 November 2016 the president officially opened the Kwame Nkrumah Interchange to traffic.

International relations

Burkina Faso 

On 3 November 2014, he led an ECOWAS delegation to Burkina Faso in response to the 2014 Burkinabé uprising. The delegation which included the Nigerian President Goodluck Jonathan and Senegalese leader Macky Sall, saw to mediate the crisis and seek an interim leader.
 
Mahama stated that with  election due next year, an interim administration could lead the country into the scheduled date with the interim administration ineligible to stand; he was supported by Sall and Jonathan.

In 2015, Ghana, Burkina Faso, and Togo signed a pact to increase relations between the three neighboring countries. The three nations agreed to ease of movement between them to work together on issues of education, health, and agriculture. The agreement also calls for the discouraging of forced marriages within all three countries, as well as tackling petroleum smuggling operations and other cross-border criminal activities that have hurt the sister countries.

Iran 

The Islamic Republic of Iran and the 6th President of Iran, Mahmoud Ahmadinejad met with John Dramani Mahama on 16 April 2013 to hold discussions with the president on strengthening the Non-Aligned Movement. There was also a bilateral meeting between Ghana and Iran at the Ghanaian presidential palace, the Jubilee House. The Government of Ghana was reciprocated with an official state visit on 5 August 2013 by the Vice-President of Ghana, Kwesi Amissah-Arthur, who met with the Vice-President of Iran, Eshaq Jahangiri on the basis of autarky and possible bilateral trade at the Islamic Republic of Iran's presidential palace, Sa'dabad Palace.

Mali 
John Mahama approved of logistical support by the Ghana Air Force to MINUSMA as Ghana participated in the Mali Civil War. The Ghana Aviation Unit provided the peacekeeping force with one C-295 which served as the sole permanent fixed-wing air support capacity of MINUSMA.

Multilateral relations 
On 30 August 2014, the Ghanaian presidency officially announced of the use of Accra as a logistics and coordination center for the airlift of supplies and personnel to countries affected by the Western African Ebola virus epidemic. The decision came into fruition after a telephonic meeting with the United Nations chief, Ban Ki-moon and president Mahama. The "National Preparedness and Response Plan for Prevention and Control of Ebola" was implemented by the government in readiness for an outbreak. This helped to build and strengthen systems in preparation for any future epidemic, or pandemic. Accra became the designated base for UNMEER.

Controversy

Corruption allegations
It was revealed in 2016 that Mahama accepted a Ford Expedition from a construction firm bidding for a lucrative government contract in 2012, while he was serving as vice president. The Burkinabe contractor who had previously constructed a wall at the Ghanaian Embassy in Ouagadougou was at the time looking to get a road-building contract in Ghana's Volta region; this contractor later secured the contract but the vehicle left by the ex president for Government use. Under Mahama's presidency in 2014, massive corruption was discovered at Ghana's Savannah Accelerated Development Authority (SADA). The authority had misappropriated millions of dollars allocated to it. SADA paid GH₵32,498,000 to ACICL, a business owned by Ghana's Roland Agambire, Mahama's close confidante, to plant five million trees in the savannah zone, but could only account for about 700,000 trees. It was also discovered that SADA spent GH¢15 million on guinea fowl, but could only account for a few of the birds. In 2015 it was again discovered that the contract for the rebranding of 116 Metro Mass Transit (MMT) buses at a cost of Gh₵3,600,000 was sole sourced and awarded to a company named "Smarttys," owned by a member of the ruling NDC activist Selassie Ibrahim. It was revealed that the rebranding of the buses cost the government Gh₵3,600,000 which at the time was more than the cost of the 116 buses.

Re-election 

John Mahama represented the National Democratic Congress (NDC) whiles Akufo-Addo was chosen once again as the presidential candidate of the New Patriotic Party during the 2016 general elections. On his third time representing the New Patriotic Party, Akufo-Addo defeated John Dramani Mahama in the first round (winning with 53.85% of the votes), which marked the first time in a Ghanaian presidential election that an opposition candidate won a majority outright in the first round.

Coinciding parliamentary elections 

The election of Members of Parliament (MPs) to the 7th Parliament of the Fourth Republic was held on 7 December 2016.  The Speaker is not an elected member of parliament though he/she is qualified to stand for election as such. There are a total of 275 constituencies in Ghana. 45 new constituencies were created prior to the 2012 election. The 7th Parliament had its first sitting on Sunday 7 January 2017 shortly after midnight to elect a Speaker and Deputy Speakers as well as for the administration of oaths to the Speaker and Members of Parliament.
Results from 238 constituencies are shown in the table below.

References 

 
Presidencies of Ghana
2012 establishments in Ghana
2017 disestablishments in Ghana
Political history of Ghana
Governments of Ghana